Doctor Thorne is a 2016 three-part (divided into four parts for broadcast in North America) television drama adaptation of the 1858 Anthony Trollope novel Doctor Thorne scripted by Julian Fellowes for ITV. Mary Thorne, penniless and with undisclosed parentage, grows up under the guardianship of her uncle Doctor Thorne. She spends much of her formative years in the company of the Gresham family at Greshamsbury Park estate. As they close on the world of adult cares and responsibilities, the past starts to impinge and the financial woes of the Gresham family threaten to tear relationships apart.

Cast

 Tom Hollander as Doctor Thorne
 Stefanie Martini as Mary Thorne
 Harry Richardson as Frank Gresham
 Rebecca Front as Lady Arabella Gresham
 Richard McCabe as Frank Gresham Snr.
 Ian McShane as Sir Roger Scatcherd
 Alison Brie as Miss Dunstable
 Janine Duvitski as Lady Scatcherd
 Edward Franklin as Louis Scatcherd
 Danny Kirrane as Mr. Moffatt
 Nell Barlow as Beatrice Gresham
 Gwyneth Keyworth as Augusta Gresham
 Phoebe Nicholls as Countess de Courcy
 Tim McMullan as Earl de Courcy
 Kate O'Flynn as Lady Alexandrina de Courcy
 Tom Bell as Lord Porlock
 Nicholas Rowe as Mortimer Gazebee
 Alex Price as  Reverend Caleb Oriel
 Cressida Bonas as Patience Oriel
 Ben Moor as Cossett
 Jane Guernier as Janet Thacker
 Sean Cernow as Jonah
 David Sterne as Mr. Romer
 Ed Cartwright as Footman
 Michael Grady-Hall as Scatcherd's Footman
 Mark Carter as Moffatt's Heckler

Episodes

Critical reaction
Response from the critics seems to have been mixed, muted, subdued, or downright critical. Even those who were predisposed to like aspects of the adaptation were not without points of issue. The Telegraph initially registered a largely positive opening assessment, although it also had some criticisms. By the end of the series its review was more mixed, yet it wanted more episodes anyway. Aggregator Rotten Tomatoes found 15 reviews and calculated an average favourable rating of 87% based on those critics.

Coverage
The series was picked up in the US by the Weinstein Company which owns the licence for North America. The series was made available on Amazon Prime on 20 May 2016. For its presentation on Amazon Prime, the series’ original three parts were recut into four episodes, each with an introduction and an epilogue featuring Fellowes himself.

Home media
The series was released on DVD in the re-cut, 4-episode version.

References

External links

2016 British television series debuts
2016 British television series endings
2010s British drama television series
ITV television dramas
Period television series
Television shows based on British novels
2010s British television miniseries
Television series by Hat Trick Productions
British drama television series
Costume drama television series
Serial drama television series
English-language television shows
Television series set in the 1850s